The Telyos is a river in Perm Krai, Russia, a right tributary of the Iren, which in turn is a tributary of the Sylva. The main tributaries are Maly Telyos (left) and the Medyanka (right).

References 

Rivers of Perm Krai